In mathematics, Cauchy's integral formula, named after Augustin-Louis Cauchy, is a central statement in complex analysis. It expresses the fact that a holomorphic function defined on a disk is completely determined by its values on the boundary of the disk, and it provides integral formulas for all derivatives of a holomorphic function. Cauchy's formula shows that, in complex analysis, "differentiation is equivalent to integration": complex differentiation, like integration, behaves well under uniform limits – a result that does not hold in real analysis.

Theorem
Let  be an open subset of the complex plane , and suppose the closed disk  defined as

The proof of this statement uses the Cauchy integral theorem and like that theorem, it only requires  to be complex differentiable.  Since  can be expanded as a power series in the variable 

it follows that holomorphic functions are analytic, i.e. they can be expanded as convergent power series.
In particular  is actually infinitely differentiable, with

This formula is sometimes referred to as Cauchy's differentiation formula.

The theorem stated above can be generalized. Moreover, as for the Cauchy integral theorem, it is sufficient to require that  be holomorphic in the open region enclosed by the path and continuous on its closure.

Note that not every continuous function on the boundary can be used to produce a function inside the boundary that fits the given boundary function. In fact, giving just the real part on the boundary of a holomorphic function is enough to determine the function up to an imaginary constant — there is only one imaginary part on the boundary that corresponds to the given real part, up to addition of a constant. We can use a combination of a Möbius transformation and the Stieltjes inversion formula to construct the holomorphic function from the real part on the boundary. For example, the function  has real part . On the unit circle this can be written . Using the Möbius transformation and the Stieltjes formula we construct the function inside the circle. The  term makes no contribution, and we find the function . This has the correct real part on the boundary, and also gives us the corresponding imaginary part, but off by a constant, namely .

Proof sketch 

On the other hand, the integral

Letting  gives the desired estimate

Example 

Let

Observe that we can rewrite  as follows:

The moduli of these points are less than 2 and thus lie inside the contour.

Now, each of these smaller integrals can be evaluated by the Cauchy integral formula, but they first must be rewritten to apply the theorem. This is analytic (since the contour does not contain the other singularity). We can simplify  to be:

and now

Since the Cauchy integral formula says that:

we can evaluate the integral as follows:

Doing likewise for the other contour:

we evaluate

The integral around the original contour  then is the sum of these two integrals:

An elementary trick using partial fraction decomposition:

Consequences
The integral formula has broad applications.  First, it implies that a function which is holomorphic in an open set is in fact infinitely differentiable there.  Furthermore, it is an analytic function, meaning that it can be represented as a power series.  The proof of this uses the dominated convergence theorem and the geometric series applied to

The formula is also used to prove the residue theorem, which is a result for meromorphic functions, and a related result, the argument principle.  It is known from Morera's theorem that the uniform limit of holomorphic functions is holomorphic. This can also be deduced from Cauchy's integral formula: indeed the formula also holds in the limit and the integrand, and hence the integral, can be expanded as a power series. In addition the Cauchy formulas for the higher order derivatives show that all these derivatives also converge uniformly.

The analog of the Cauchy integral formula in real analysis is the Poisson integral formula for harmonic functions; many of the results for holomorphic functions carry over to this setting. No such results, however, are valid for more general classes of differentiable or real analytic functions.  For instance, the existence of the first derivative of a real function need not imply the existence of higher order derivatives, nor in particular the analyticity of the function.  Likewise, the uniform limit of a sequence of (real) differentiable functions may fail to be differentiable, or may be differentiable but with a derivative  which is not the limit of the derivatives of the members of the sequence.

From Cauchy's inequality, one can easily deduce that every bounded entire function must be constant (which is Liouville's theorem).

The formula can also be used to derive Gauss's Mean-Value Theorem, which states

This can be calculated directly via a parametrization of the circle.

Generalizations

Smooth functions
A version of Cauchy's integral formula is the Cauchy–Pompeiu formula, and holds for smooth functions as well, as it is based on Stokes' theorem. Then 

Moreover, if in an open set D,

The first conclusion is, succinctly, that the convolution  of a compactly supported measure with the Cauchy kernel

Here  denotes the principal value. The second conclusion asserts that the Cauchy kernel is a fundamental solution of the Cauchy–Riemann equations. Note that for smooth complex-valued functions  of compact support on  the generalized Cauchy integral formula simplifies to

and is a restatement of the fact that, considered as a distribution,  is a fundamental solution of the Cauchy–Riemann operator . The generalized Cauchy integral formula can be deduced for any bounded open region  with  boundary  from this result and the formula for the distributional derivative of the characteristic function  of :

where the distribution on the right hand side denotes contour integration along .

Several variables
In several complex variables, the Cauchy integral formula can be generalized to polydiscs .  Let  be the polydisc given as the Cartesian product of  open discs :

Then

where .

In real algebras

The Cauchy integral formula is generalizable to real vector spaces of two or more dimensions.  The insight into this property comes from geometric algebra, where objects beyond scalars and vectors (such as planar bivectors and volumetric trivectors) are considered, and a proper generalization of Stokes' theorem.

For example, a vector field generally has in its derivative a scalar part, the divergence, and a bivector part, the curl. This particular derivative operator has a Green's function:

By definition of a Green's function,

It is this useful property that can be used, in conjunction with the generalized Stokes theorem:

The function  can, in principle, be composed of any combination of multivectors. The proof of Cauchy's integral theorem for higher dimensional spaces relies on the using the generalized Stokes theorem on the quantity  and use of the product rule:

When ,  is called a monogenic function, the generalization of holomorphic functions to higher-dimensional spaces — indeed, it can be shown that the Cauchy–Riemann condition is just the two-dimensional expression of the monogenic condition.  When that condition is met, the second term in the right-hand integral vanishes, leaving only

where  is that algebra's unit -vector, the pseudoscalar.  The result is

Thus, as in the two-dimensional (complex analysis) case, the value of an analytic (monogenic) function at a point can be found by an integral over the surface surrounding the point, and this is valid not only for scalar functions but vector and general multivector functions as well.

See also
Cauchy–Riemann equations
Methods of contour integration
Nachbin's theorem
Morera's theorem
Mittag-Leffler's theorem
Green's function generalizes this idea to the non-linear setup
Schwarz integral formula
Parseval–Gutzmer formula
Bochner–Martinelli formula

Notes

References
 .

External links 
 
 

Augustin-Louis Cauchy
Theorems in complex analysis